Dato' Sudirman bin Haji Arshad,  (25 May 1954 – 22 February 1992), known mononymously as Sudirman, was a Malaysian singer and songwriter. His singing career kicked off after winning the Bintang RTM singing competition on 11 August 1976. His career defining moment came after he was awarded winner of the "1989 Asia's No. 1 Performer" title which he won during the ‘'Asian Popular Music Awards'’ competition held at the Royal Albert Hall in London on 19 March 1989. 
Throughout his career, he was known as the "Singing Lawyer", the "People's Singer", the "Patriotic Singer" and the "Elvis Presley and Claude François of Malaysia" in his native country. Apart from being a renowned singer from Malaysia he was also a trained lawyer, a composer, writer (specifically focusing in producing memoir and children books), cartoonist, canned drinks entrepreneur and an actor.

Early life
Sudirman, born on 25 May 1954 in Temerloh, Pahang, was the youngest of seven siblings and born to Arshad Hassan and Romlah Dahalan. His father Arshad was a manager of a local bus company in Sudirman's family hometown, whereas his mother Romlah who used to work as a seamstress and was also the first woman to become a Malaysian state assemblywoman in Pahang during the 1950s. Both of his parent had also been involved in the business of fabrics and clothing. Sources revealed that he was given the name of 'Sudirman' by his father who had hoped that he would grow up to become a brave warrior like Indonesian army general Soedirman, the man he was named after.

His passion for singing and entertainment started at a very young age, as during his childhood he would entertain his family and neighbours as they in turn would happily let him do so and encourage him.

He completed his secondary education in Sultan Abu Bakar School (SABS), Kuantan. After turning down a scholarship to further his studies in medicine, he studied law instead from the University of Malaya in 1976 and received his degree with third class honours four years later together with Malaysia's current and former Attorney General Tan Sri Idrus Harun and Tan Sri Abdul Gani Patail. He commenced his pupillage in 1982 under Mr Ong Joo Theam of Messrs Abdul Aziz, Ong & Co. He was called to the Bar in 1984 in and commenced practice thereafter, though he left due to lack of interest.

It was during his period of studying law that he managed to juggle time between singing and tutorial classes. His big break came when he entered Johan Bintang RTM, a singing competition organised by public broadcaster Radio Televisyen Malaysia held in Malacca in August 1976, where he swooned the audience with his spontaneous sense of humour and melodious singing.

Career

Music
Possessing of a clear piercing tenor with a surprising breadth of range and dynamic control especially at the extreme high end, Sudirman's voice was instantly recognisable every time one of his songs are played in local radio or television. His ability to act through his voice is evident from songs such as "Bercanda di Pasiran Pantai", a Latin-flavoured duet with Anita Sarawak which displayed the sultry quality of his voice. His unique talents had helped him to win many local competitions from Bintang RTM Best Singer (1976) to Muzik-Muzik TV3 Best Performer and Berita Harian Popularity contest Most Popular Artist voted by fans. He topped Malaysian, Brunei and Indonesia charts with songs such as "Merisik Khabar" (Seeking Greetings), "Milik Siapakah Gadis Ini" (Whose Girl Were Owned By) and "Salam Terakhir" (Final Greetings). Songwriters who have supported him in the past include S. Atan, Manan Ngah, Michael Veerapan and Syed Harun. Even today, his songs are popularly played especially during National Day and Eid-ul-Fitr.

Sudirman was also the first Malaysian singer to perform at The Paddock at the Hilton of Kuala Lumpur in 1983 and was the singing ambassador for companies such as Proton, Malaysia Airlines, Honda and honoured pioneer card member with Hong Leong Bank. He was known for his versatility and sang Malay, Indian, Chinese and English songs with outstanding choreography. He was even known for sketching portraits of his fans while singing.

Local musicians who have played for him include Alex Boon, Jay Jay (singer guitarist), Hillary Ang, Ricky Omar, Fauzi Marzuki, Michael Veerapan, Mac Chiew and Jenny Chin. Local women who have performed with him as his dancers (whom he refers to as "The Girls") include Joanne (Zainal Abidin's wife), supermodel the late Samantha Schubert and Linda Jasmine Hashim (now one of the leading dancing choreographer cum teacher in Malaysia's reality TV program show Akademi Fantasia).

Some Muslim fundamentalists and leftists detested his concert performances. Some even threatened and distributed warning pamphlets of "something would happen" during his Universiti Kebangsaan Malaysia (UKM) Bangi concert to deter people from attending, possibly concerning about his songs were claimed to being mixed with Western influences, which would derail the Muslim faiths. The concert was postponed following protests from the UKM students union body, its academic staff association and the dean of the Islamic Studies faculty and six other student bodies, whose were concerning about Sudirman's "attempt to destroying the Eastern culture and Islamic holiness by performing the derailed Western style". This incident was captured by Zainuddin Maidin (then journalist, now former Minister of Information) in his book "The Other Side of Mahathir". He narrated that the then-Prime Minister Mahathir Mohamad had called a few ministers to his residence to review the situation as the issue reflected Malaysia's position in terms of modernisation. The meeting led to the conclusion that the show had to be allowed to go on. Sudirman's fans turned up in force. He went about pleasing the crowd, crooning his hits. One campus resident said, "At last something alive has come here." The negativity surrounding the UKM incident was not long-lasting. Ironically, a couple of years after Sudirman's death in 1992, UKM held a Sudirman karaoke competition.

Sudirman produced an album for his favourite nephew, Razman Azrai, under Sudirman Productions. Also known as Atai, he had a couple of hit songs that topped the charts in 1985. Atai also performed for Malaysia Day in 2014, Chow Kit Road concert 2.0 in 2016 and in SEA Games in 2017.

In April 1983, Sudirman sang a song for the late Puan Sri Saloma titled "Mama". When Sudirman approached her shortly before her death, Saloma expressed her disbelief with tears – that someone like Sudirman would still remember and make a song solely for her.

On 14 April 1986, Sudirman held an open-air concert on Chow Kit Road, which was the first time ever that a street concert drew a 100,000-strong crowd on a Monday night. It jammed the stretch of Jalan Tuanku Abdul Rahman, Jalan Raja Muda to Jalan Raja Alang. Tan Sri Zaman Khan the Head of KL police then mentioned 'the crowd was so huge that we were praying at the office  that it would be controlled'  Several fans fainted in the crowd, a few suffocated and were rushed to the hospital. Fans was seen not only on streets but on top of roofs and trees. A Malaysian English tabloid, The Star, wrote that "Kuala Lumpur came to a standstill and it had nothing to do with the recession, but with one man, Malaysia's top entertainer, an electrifying performance and most memorable night".

Sudirman's songs topped the charts with every new album that he released. There was a time when his song "Merisik Khabar" climbed up to the No. 1 position for two months while his second song "Milik Siapa Gadis Ini" from the same album came in second and stayed at the top for a few weeks after "Merisik Khabar".

In 1989, Sudirman won the title "Best Performer" at the Salem Asia Music Award 1989 contest at the Royal Albert Hall in London, defeating among other contenders Hong Kong Cantopop legend Leslie Cheung, Singapore's Best Entertainer Anita Sarawak , Japanese singer-songwriter Epo, Thailand Queen of Rock - Anchalee, Taiwan's Best - Chyi Chin, China's Rock and Roll Phenomenon Cui Jian, South Korea's Koo Chang Mo and Philippines best selling pop singer Kuh Ledesma . Judges include Sinitta Renau Malone, mentor in Britain famous TV program, UK X factor and was dating Simon Cowell of American Idol. Other prominent judges include Chairman of BPI British Phonographic Industry Peter Jamieson, Dutch singer C.C. Catch and James Fisher Director of European Collection Body ASCAP. BoneyM was the performing guest of the contest.

He was chosen to solely perform for the closing ceremony of the Southeast Asian Games on the same year and many others such as the opening ceremony of Sepak Takraw competition, Merdeka, New Year and other national functions. In most cases, he would use his own money to ensure a successful concert.

Sudirman Arshad also had a strong fanbase in Singapore. His concert there resulted in a large turnout at the Kallang National Stadium in August 1987. People came from all classes, races and ages. Kelvin Tan Look Siew, Director of Singapore Armed Forces Music & Drama company, said, "We wanted to bring down a prominent artist from the region and Sudirman's name automatically cropped up."

EMI London took him on to work together with Stock, Aitken & Waterman (British producer trio who took on Kylie Minogue, Jason Donovan and Rick Astley) with a song titled "Love Will Find a Way", released on the album Rising by Donovan. Vic Lanza, manager of WHAM (duet of George Michael and Andrew Ridgeley) pronounced Sudirman as the institution of Malaysian Music industry. He was brought to The Beatles famous Abbey Road Studios and recorded the album, but died soon afterwards.

Literatures
Sudirman Arshad wrote his autobiography Dari Dalam Sudir (From Inside Sudir), comic book Sejarah Awal Sudirman (Sudirman's Early History) in addition to some cartoons and weekly columns for magazines and some local newspapers such as Karangkraf.

One of his books for children titled "Taming Si Budak Pintar" (Taming The Genius Kid) was recognised the best by Mobil-Mabopa, a Mobil Oil book writing competition.

Moreover, he was also a journalist and columnist, who wrote on various serious issues. One journalist puts it, "It was quite difficult for us to concentrate on our job. The person sitting across the table during the meeting is a celebrity!" Those he interviewed include Tun Ghafar Baba.

Acting
Besides singing and writing, Sudirman also acted in a film called Kami (We), which was released in 1982. It was about two destitute orphans who find each other amidst the Kuala Lumpur street life. One of the film's tracks, "Pelangi Petang", or Evening Rainbow, has since been heralded as one of his iconic works.

Television
Aside from hosting various main prime time TV singing programs like Mekar Sejambak, Sudirman also successfully hosted Malaysia's TV prime time gameshow "Keluarga Bahagia Singer". This program was sponsored by Singer Malaysia, a subsidiary of Singer Corporation (before it was taken over by Berjaya Group in 1989).

Charity work
Sudirman was also well known for his charity work in which he helped invite veteran artists in the slots of his singing shows aside from giving them generous donations. Money charity for mosques and people in need such as Yayasan Ozanam was something he would do willingly. During his life, he had also adopted and brought up an Indian boy from a poor family and he would actively seek charity work through the Singers, Musicians and Composers Association of Malaysia (PAPITA).

Business
Sudirman Arshad also became Malaysia's first successful singer-entrepreneur by promoting Malaysia's most famous carbonated drink Sudi, with business magazines and TV programs from Australia to Hong Kong featuring the drinks. Within six months, Sudi broke five per cent of the carbonated drink market in Malaysia.

Later, after his conglomerate, SUDI Sdn. Bhd., was established, Sudirman opened a franchise of Sudi Shoppe clothing apparel famous for his unique sunglass signature, and his restaurant, Restoran Selera Sudi located at the side of his record studio, Sudirman Productions. The company initially plans to unleashing "Sudi Rasa" - a processed canned meals such as sardines, coconut powders, fruits, cocktails and instant noodles. It also purposed to revealing special cooking oils, tomato and chilli sauces, under the same product name.

He was Malaysia's first singer to be on the cover of Malaysian Business and Asian Business magazine. He had a business office atop the UBN Shangrila Tower and Sri Hartamas. He also served as Vice-President of PAPITA.

Aside from food company, Sudirman also owns a record studio, Sudirman Productions, located at somewhere what is now Taman Sri Hartamas.

During its active years, it had been recording several albums involving various singers, including Sahabat, Sudirman's album dedicated to his nephew, Razman Azrai Zainudin, or Atai. He also hires Michael Bernie Chin and Dharanee Dharan Kannan in 1987 before their resignations and forced him to run the studio by himself. In that period, he chooses singer Uji Rashid, known for her beautiful voices, to partner with him. Actually, she also had a commitment with a private drama studio, which she runs, causing her to being outside Kuala Lumpur for a long time. These revelations forcing Sudirman to shut down his record studio in 1991.

Sudirman's companies were ceased to exist in September 1991, shortly before his death, due to the financial and leadership crisis as well as his worsening illness.

Illness and death
On 17 July 1991, Sudirman was admitted to Pusat Perubatan Tawakkal Kuala Lumpur (ICU) for 4 days. It was reported that he collapsed while singing at Butterworth, Penang. He died at 4 a.m. on 22 February 1992 at the age of 37 at his sister's (Datin Rudiah) house in Bangsar, Kuala Lumpur after suffering from pneumonia for 7 months.

Thousands in Malaysia took part in his funeral procession. His remains were sent to his hometown in Temerloh, Pahang. Later, he was laid to rest at Chengal Muslim Cemetery, Temerloh, near the graves of his parents.

Legacy
As Malaysians united in celebration of his historic success, a visibly jubilant Sudirman dedicated the win to his country and Prime Minister Mahathir Mohamad, who was then serving the first half of his unprecedented two-time premiership career.

Sudirman Arshad was named 'Malaysia's Singing Ambassador' by the Malaysia Tourism Development Board (MTDC). He was the voice behind the MTDC (Malaysian Tourism Development Corp) tune, To know Malaysia is to love Malaysia which was composed by American Emmy, Grammy and Oscar nominated singer and songwriter Carol Connors. He was referred to as the 'Singing Dynamite' by Singaporean journalists. His singing brought him standing ovations in Australia (in Sydney and Melbourne), Japan, Kuwait and the United States (Hawaii). Simon Napier-Bell, the manager for George Michael's band Wham!, referred to Sudirman Arshad as the 'institution of Malaysian music industry'.

Sudirman's work was recognised by the industry when he was posthumously awarded an Anugerah Industri Muzik award and a street (Jalan Sudirman) was named after him in his hometown of Temerloh. PAPITA created an award especially categorised under his name, which to this date has yet to be won by anyone.

In the Malaysian Book of Records, Sudirman Arshad was given a posthumous award together with P Ramlee, Mokhtar Dahari, Tun Ghafar Baba and Ramasamy Letchemanah (Mighty Man).

On 26 July 2010, The National Choir paid a tribute to the late entertainer by organising a concert in conjunction with the KL Music Festival 2010, with an audience of about 1,000 present.

In 2011, his life journey documentary, Sudirman Arshad aired on The History Channel (Astro Channel 555) on 20 February 2011. Produced by FINAS and AETN All-Asia Networks. It also reaired on RTM on 22 February 2015.

On 2014, Malaysia's 57th independence day's theme is "Disini Lahirnya Sebuah Cinta" (Malay meaning for "Here Is The Birth Of Love") which is the starting line for Sudirman's "Warisan" (Malay meaning for "Legacy")

On 3 to 5 November 2016 Kuala Lumpur Performing Arts Centre created  musical tribute for Sudirman with 3 nights in a row, sold out having sponsors from JTI Malaysia, UEM Group, My Kasih Foundation, Yakult, Ambank and Nationwide Express. Yayasan Sime Darby gave out its first ever fund to create  Sudirman Scholarship Fund for young talent.

On 25 May 2019, on Arshad’s 65th birthday, he was honored with a Google Doodle.

On 18 Aug 2022, the National Archive organized a Sudirman Gallery in the heart of Kuala Lumpur at Fahrenheit 88 mall, launched by the son of the Malaysian King, Regent of Pahang, Pemangku Raja Pahang, Tengku Hassanal Ibrahim Alam Shah Al-Sultan Abdullah Ri'ayatuddin Al-Mustafa Billah Shah

On 31st Aug 2022, Xanadu.asia launched Sudirman's first Metaverse, a Malaysia's first Singer to be in a Metaverse for National Independent day

Awards and recognitions

Penghibur TV Terbaik, Anugerah Seri Angkasa, RTM 1978
"Malaysia's Singing Ambassador" MTDC 1985 ("To know Malaysia is to love Malaysia")
Persembahan Terbaik Anugerah Juara Lagu TV3, 1987
Malaysia's Indian Music Award, 1987
Penyanyi Lelaki Popular, Anugerah Bintang Popular Berita Harian 1989
Asia's Number One Performer at the Salem Music Award London, 1989
Malaysia Guinness Awards
Ahli Mahkota Pahang by Sultan of Pahang, 1990
Ahli Mangku Negara by Yang di-Pertuan Agong, 1990
Johan Mangku Negara by Yang di-Pertuan Agong, 1992
No. 1 Malaysian singer (from New Straits Times)
Darjah Sultan Ahmad Shah Pahang (DSAP), carrying the posthumous title of Dato' by Sultan of Pahang, 2009
Balik Kampung voted as Malaysia's best song ever by readers of the Star Online, 2013
 song "Disini Lahirnya Sebuah Cinta"  chosen for National Independence Day theme (Tema Merdeka Malaysia Ke-57), 2014
 Sudirman Scholarship Fund created by Yayasan Sime Darby launched in Kuala Lumpur Performing Arts Centre on 5 November 2016 with a musical tribute
 In South East Asia Games 2017, Sudirman's song balik kampung was performed by his nephew 'Atai' and ' Datuk Aznil Hj Nawawi'
 University Malaya launched Sudirman exhibition centre in its library in 2018
 Sudirman Cafe at EDC Hotel KL launched in 2018
 Tun Mahathir on 14 June 2018 eve of eid mentioned Selamat Hari Raya song sang and written by Sudirman as his favourite eid song
 25 May 2019, Google doodles Sudirman on his birth date
 18 Aug 2022, Archive Department, Kamura and Sudirman Asset Management launched "Sudirman Gallery" officiated by the Regent of Pahang, Kebawah Duli Yang Maha Mulia Tengku Hassanal Ibrahim Alam Shah ibni Al-Sultan Abdullah Ri’ayatuddin Al-Mustafa Billah Shah
 31 Aug 2022 Launching of a Malaysian artist first metaverse by Mnstry Mxr

Discography
 Teriring Doa 1976 (EP)
 Aku Penghiburmu (1978)
 Perasaan (1979)
 Anak Muda (1980)
 Lagu Anak Desa (1981)
 Lagu Dari Kota (1981)
 Twinkle Twinkle Little Star (1981)
 Abadi (1982)
 Lagu Cinta (1982)
 Images (1983)
 Orang Baru (1984)
 Lagu Dari Sebuah Bilik (1984)
 Orang Kampung (1986)
 Kul it! (1986)
 Asia’s No. 1 Performer (1989)

Among his other songs are Tanggal 31 Ogos and Tegakkan Bendera Kita.

Filmography

Film

Television

References

Further reading
 Nin, Ghafar; Muhamad, Amira, Detik Terakhir Sudirman, Cita Khidmat (Malaysia), 1992,

External links
 Sudirman at 7digital
 Sudirman Haji Arshad at Pahang Delights
 

1954 births
1992 deaths
People from Pahang
Malaysian people of Malay descent
Malaysian Muslims
20th-century Malaysian lawyers
Malaysian male pop singers
Malaysian pop rock singers
Malaysian rhythm and blues singers
Malay-language singers
Bintang RTM winners
Companions of the Order of the Defender of the Realm
Members of the Order of the Defender of the Realm
University of Malaya alumni
20th-century Malaysian male singers